The Halifax Regional Municipality (HRM) in Nova Scotia, Canada has a widely varied geography.

Physical geography
The coast, which is mostly rock with small isolated sand beaches in sheltered bays, is heavily indented by numerous inlets the largest of which are St. Margarets Bay, Halifax Harbour, Cole Harbour, Musquodoboit Harbour, Jeddore Harbour, Ship Harbour and Sheet Harbour.

The Chebucto Peninsula, created by the indentations of St. Margarets Bay and Halifax Harbour (including the Bedford Basin), is a defining feature for the shape of the coastline at the western end of HRM, from which the Halifax Peninsula forms a sub-peninsula.

Despite the size of its landmass, the population of the municipality is heavily concentrated, with rural communities located along the Eastern Shore and South Shore or in the Musquodoboit Valley. The majority of residents are concentrated in the urban area surrounding Halifax Harbour/Bedford Basin and extending up the Sackville River valley and northeast of the harbour along the Highway 102 corridor.

HRM's boundary includes all of the former Halifax County, except for several First Nation reserves.

The topography of HRM is quite varied, ranging from rocky shorelines to sandy beaches on the coast, to landscapes shaped by glaciation including exposed bedrock, numerous freshwater lakes, medium-sized rivers and streams, drumlins and low hills. The fertile valley along the Musquodoboit River in the northeastern part of HRM is the only agricultural district of note in the municipality. Aside from the settled communities and the urban area surrounding Halifax Harbour, the rest of the municipality's landscape mostly supports a dense combination of mixed Acadian or coniferous forests.

HRM's population centre (urban area) is built on a series of hills and plateaus surrounding Halifax Harbour. The central part of the community of Halifax lies on a peninsula extending from the western side of the harbour and dominated by the drumlin which supported the Citadel Hill defensive works. Dartmouth is clustered on the eastern side of the harbour directly opposite the Halifax peninsula, its defining geographic feature being a series of glacial lakes. Suburban growth around both cities included many existing mining (east of Dartmouth and the Shubenacadie Valley), farming (in the Musquodoboit Valley and northwest of Halifax) and fishing (along the shores of the harbours and the Atlantic coast south of both former cities) communities.

Climate

Halifax is marked by a humid continental climate (Köppen Dfb), but the area climate is heavily influenced by water temperatures in the adjacent Atlantic Ocean. Numerous local microclimates make weather somewhat unpredictable but the region is generally milder than inland areas having a continental climate (e.g. central Canada); HRM air temperatures average between -5 °C (23 °F) in January and 19 °C (66 °F) in July.

Some, but usually very little, snow falls in May and October. Halifax usually experiences several strong winter storms. The storm was nicknamed "White Juan", after the recent Hurricane Juan. Spring is cool and foggy, early autumn is often sunny and warm, and summer can range from hot and dry to cool and rainy. Hurricanes are fairly uncommon but do occur occasionally. There can be considerable variations between the weather near the Atlantic Ocean and the weather even several kilometres inland. This is partly caused by the effect of the Labrador Current, which transfers cold water from the Arctic along Nova Scotia's Atlantic coast in the spring and summer, while the Gulf Stream brings warmer water from the Gulf of Mexico along the coast during the fall and winter.

Precipitation stands at nearly  annually, and is somewhat heavy year-round, though summer is drier.

The Halifax Regional Municipality is home to 6 weather stations operated by the Meteorological Service of Canada:
 Halifax International Airport
 Buoy 44258 Halifax Harbour
 CFB Shearwater
 McNabs Island
 Sable Island
 Beaver Island
 Malay Falls

Notes

References